Miguel Ángel Deniz Mendez (born November 17, 1982, in Las Palmas, Canary Islands) is a B1/S11 swimmer from Spain.   He competed at the 1996 Summer Paralympics and the  2004 Summer Paralympics where he did not win a medal.  He competed at the 2000 Summer Paralympics, winning a bronze medal in the 4 x 100 meter medley Relay 49 Points race and in the 100 meter backstroke event.

References 

Living people
1982 births
Spanish male backstroke swimmers
Spanish male breaststroke swimmers
Spanish male freestyle swimmers
Spanish male medley swimmers
Paralympic bronze medalists for Spain
Swimmers at the 1996 Summer Paralympics
Swimmers at the 2000 Summer Paralympics
Swimmers at the 2004 Summer Paralympics
Sportspeople from Las Palmas
Paralympic medalists in swimming
Medalists at the 2000 Summer Paralympics
Paralympic swimmers of Spain
S11-classified Paralympic swimmers
Medalists at the World Para Swimming Championships